Communist Party (or KP) was a communist party in Turkey founded in 2014.

Development
Following a period of internal strife within the then-defunct Communist Party of Turkey (TKP), the party decided to split in two. On 15 July 2014, the two rival factions reached a consensus to freeze the activities of the former party and that neither faction shall use the name and emblem of TKP. The faction led by Kemal Okuyan and Aydemir Güler founded the Communist Party on 17 July 2014, with the other faction forming the People's Communist Party of Turkey (HTKP).

Electoral performance

References

External links
 

2014 establishments in Turkey
Defunct communist parties in Turkey
Far-left politics in Turkey
Political parties established in 2014
International Meeting of Communist and Workers Parties